Yakhdan may refer to:
 Yakhdan, Afghanistan
 Yakhdan, Iran